Poggio Torriana is a comune (municipality) in the Province of Rimini in the Italian region Emilia-Romagna.

It was formed January 1, 2014 with the merger of municipalities Poggio Berni and Torriana.

References

Cities and towns in Emilia-Romagna